William Randall Cook (November 21, 1963 – October 27, 2021) was an American computer scientist, who was an associate professor in the Department of Computer Sciences at the University of Texas at Austin.

Early life and education 
Cook was born on November 21, 1963. He received his Ph.D. in computer science from Brown University in 1989.

Career 
Cook's research concentrated on object-oriented programming, programming languages, modeling languages, and the interface between programming languages and databases. Prior to joining UT in 2003,  he was chief technology officer and co-founder of Allegis Corporation, where he was chief architect for several award-winning products, including the eBusiness Suite at Allegis, the writer's Solution for Prentice Hall, and the AppleScript language at Apple Computer.

Cook won the Senior Dahl–Nygaard Prize in 2014.

Personal life 
Cook died on October 27, 2021, at the age of 57.

Selected papers
Inheritance is not subtyping, Proceedings of the 17th ACM SIGPLAN-SIGACT symposium on Principles of programming languages (1990)
AppleScript. Proceedings of the third ACM SIGPLAN conference on History of programming languages (HOPL III) Pages 1–21 ACM, 2007.

References

External links
Home page at University of Texas
Papers and citations according to Google Scholar.
Publications as listed in DBLP.

1963 births
2021 deaths
American chief technology officers
American computer scientists
Brown University alumni
University of Texas at Austin faculty

Dahl–Nygaard Prize